is a private junior college in Utsunomiya, Tochigi, Japan, established in 1967. It is attached to Utsunomiya Kyowa University.

External links
 Official website 

Japanese junior colleges
Educational institutions established in 1967
Private universities and colleges in Japan
Universities and colleges in Tochigi Prefecture
Utsunomiya